The iTest (formerly known as the American High School Internet Mathematics Competition (AHSIMC)), was founded in 2004 by Bradley Metrock and takes place each September, offering students from across the country to compete against the best and brightest high school students in a highly competitive environment.

Guidelines
Any American high school student (or middle school, though the competition may be too challenging for all but the brightest of these) may compete in a team of up to five people. Students are not required to be students of the same school, or even residents of the same state.  Because of the decentralized nature of the competition, an advisor such as a teacher of a guardian is required for each team to monitor the team and vouch for compliance with the competition's rules. No computer or calculator programs or applications are allowed on the iTest, though graphing calculator use is allowed.

Format
Prior to 2008, it had consisted of 25 multiple-choice questions (with 1 answer choice on the first problem, 2 on the second, etc.), 25 short-answer questions, and 10 "Ultimate" questions, which are much like relay questions in that each Ultimate question depends on the answer to the previous ones. In 2008, it consisted only of 100 multiple choice or short answer problems. There were 4 Tiebreaker proof questions up until 2008 - in the 2008 competition, ties were solely broken by submission time.

Participation 
Students from 44 states have participated in the iTest, including home school students.  In 2005, the iTest admitted the American School of Warsaw in Poland as part of a pilot program to open the competition to international schools.

Naming
When the iTest was founded in 2004, it was named the American High School Internet Mathematics Competition, as mentioned before. However, the iTest soon became its nickname, and the competition officially adopted the name in 2007.

Prizes 
The iTest offers a different prize each year, attempting to reward the top students with cutting edge technology.  
 In 2004, each student on the winning team was awarded their choice of a Microsoft Xbox, Sony PlayStation 2, or Nintendo GameCube.
 In 2005, each participant of the winning team was given an Apple iPod nano.
 In 2006, each member of the winning team received a Wii, Nintendo DS Lite, and a copy of Brain Age. (Wiis were not given due to availability issues).
 In 2007, each member of the winning team was awarded a $200 Best Buy gift card.

Prizes are also offered for other criteria, including State Champion, Sponsor's Award for Leadership, and Best Team Name.

Winners
 2004: Gangsta Feedbags
 2005: Team Dominators
 2006: Quagga
 2007: North Carolina
 2008: Purchase Cellophane (AAST)

iTest logos

References

External links
 AHSMIC Forum moderated by iTest creator Bradley Metrock
 iTest Blog
 http://itest.sourceforge.net/ official site for iTest
 https://www.bradleymetrock.com/ official site for Bradley Metrock

Mathematics competitions
Recurring events established in 2004